"Big in Japan" is a song performed by French DJ and record producer Martin Solveig and Canadian synthpop band Dragonette from Solveig's fifth studio album, Smash (2011). It features vocals from Japanese girl group Idoling!!!. The song was written and produced by Solveig, and released as the album's third single on 24 October 2011. "Big in Japan" has charted in Belgium, Canada and the United Kingdom.

The song's album version has different lyrics than the single version.

Music video
The music video for "Big in Japan" premiered on 18 October 2011. The video was shot just one week before the 2011 Tōhoku earthquake and tsunami. It closes with the caption: "This video was shot before the tragic events of March 2011. We share the grief of our Japanese friends and admire their courage throughout these difficult times. With this in mind and together, there are more reasons than ever to be Big In Japan!"

Track listings
Digital download
 "Big in Japan" (feat. Idoling!!!) – 3:06

UK digital EP
 "Big in Japan" (Radio Edit) - 2:46
 "Big in Japan" (Single Version) - 3:06
 "Big in Japan" (Club Edit) - 4:50
 "Big in Japan" (Ziggy Stardust Mix) - 5:26
 "Big in Japan" (Les Bros Mix) - 5:30
 "Big in Japan" (Denzal Park Mix) - 6:44
 "Big in Japan" (Thom Syma mIX) - 5:51

12" single
 "Big in Japan" (Club Edit)
 "Big in Japan" (Les Bros Remix)
 "Big in Japan" (Denzal Park Remix)
 "Big in Japan" (Radio Edit)

Credits
Written by Martin Solveig & Martina Sorbara
Composed & produced by Martin Solveig
Published by Dragonette Inc., Fujipacific Music Inc. & Temps D'Avance
Lead vocals & backing vocals - Dragonette & Idoling!!!
Instruments & programming - Martin Solveig
Mixed by Martin Solveig & Philippe Weiss at Red Room Studio, Suresnes
Mastered by Tom Coyne at Sterling Sound, New York City
Idoling!!! appears courtesy of Pony Canyon Inc.

Charts

Release history

References

2011 singles
2011 songs
Martin Solveig songs
Dragonette songs
Mercury Records singles
Songs about Japan
Songs written by Martin Solveig
Songs written by Martina Sorbara
Song recordings produced by Martin Solveig
Japan in non-Japanese culture